The Minister of Personnel, Public Grievances and Pensions is the cabinet minister in charge of Ministry of Personnel, Public Grievances and Pensions. The position is generally held by the prime minister, but sometimes it has been held by other senior members of the cabinet, such as the Minister of Home Affairs. The minister is generally assisted by a minister of state.

Powers 
As the Minister of Personnel, Public Grievances and Pensions, the prime minister exercises control over the Indian Administrative Service (IAS), the country's premier civil service, which staffs most of the senior civil service positions; the Public Enterprises Selection Board (PESB); and the Central Bureau of Investigation (CBI), except for the selection of its director, who is chosen by a committee of: (a) the prime minister, as chairperson; (b) the leader of the opposition in Lok Sabha; (c) and the chief justice.

List of Ministers

List of Ministers of State

Notes

References

Union ministers of India
Ministry of Personnel, Public Grievances and Pensions
Lists of government ministers of India